The Attic may refer to:

Attic (disambiguation)

Film
 The Attic (1962 film), an Italian comedy film
 The Attic (1980 film), a horror–thriller film starring Ray Milland and Carrie Snodgress, about a young woman caring for her disabled father 
 The Attic (2007 film), a horror film starring Elisabeth Moss, about a haunted attic
 The Attic: The Hiding of Anne Frank, a 1988 television film
 "The Attic" (Dollhouse), an episode of Dollhouse

Music
 The Attic (band)
 The Attic (musical), a Hungarian musical
 The Attic (magazine), an online music magazine

Other uses
 The Attic (restaurant), formerly in West Vancouver
 The Attic or Mansarda: satirična poema, a 1962 novel by Danilo Kiš